The Wan Chai Temporary Promenade is along the Hong Kong Convention and Exhibition Centre in Wan Chai, Hong Kong.

External links

 

Wan Chai North